Charles-Victor Armand called Armand Séville (? – 1847) was a 19th-century French journalist, novelist, chansonnier, poet and playwright.

Chief editor of the Mentor (1824), his plays were presented on the most significant Parisian stages of the 19th century: Théâtre du Vaudeville, Théâtre de la Gaité, etc.

He published his novels under the pen name Pascal Thorre.

Works 

1801: Le Quaterne, vaudeville in 1 act, in prose
1804: Le Café du ventriloque, folie-vaudeville in 1 act, in prose
1805: Un quart d'heure dramatique, folie-vaudeville
1805: J'essaie, monologue mixed with vaudevilles
1805: Le Porte-feuille galant, a collection dedicated to the ladies
1806: Le Dernier Bulletin, ou la Paix, impromptu mixed with vaudevilles
1806: Métusko, ou les Polonais, melodrama in 3 acts, extravaganza
1811: Grammaire française, with Charles François Lhomond
1813: Laissez-moi faire, ou la Soubrette officieuse, vaudeville in 1 act
1813: Précis de l'histoire de France, depuis l'établissement de la monarchie jusqu'au règne de Napoléon Ier
1814: Salut au Roi, with Casimir Ménestrier and Paul Ledoux
1814: L'Élan du cœur, hommage au roi Louis XVIII, with Ménestrier
1814: Chansonnier des joyeux
1815: L'Habit de cour, ou le Moraliste de nouvelle étoffe
1817: Elémens de la grammaire Française, with Lhomond
1826: La Liquidation, comédie en vaudevilles in 1 act and in prose, with Benjamin Antier
1826: La Famille Girard, ou les Prisonniers français, tableau militaire-anecdote in 1 act, with Louis Portelette
1826: Le Forçat libéré, mélodrama in three acts, with Francis Cornu
1833: Les Bariolés, novel, 2 vols.
1834: L'Orme aux loups, novel

Bibliography 
 Joseph-François et Louis-Gabriel Michaud, Biographie universelle, ancienne et moderne, 1849, 
 Joseph Marie Quérard, Les supercheries littéraires dévoilées, vol.5, 1853, 
 Violette Leduc, Antony Méray, Bibliographie des chansons, fabliaux..., 1859, 

19th-century French dramatists and playwrights
19th-century French journalists
French male journalists
19th-century French novelists
19th-century French poets
French chansonniers
Year of birth missing
1847 deaths
19th-century male writers
18th-century births